The 1958 USA–USSR Track and Field Dual Meet was an international track and field competition between the Soviet Union and the United States. The first in a series of meetings between the nations, it was held in 27 and 28 July in Moscow and finished with Soviet Union beating the United States 172:170. The meet marked an unusual head-to-head for the nations during the Cold War.

Results

Teams

Men

Women

References
Turrini, Joseph M. "It Was Communism Versus the Free World": The USA-USSR Dual Track Meet Series and the Development of Track and Field in the United States, 1958–1985. Journal of Sport History, Vol. 28, No. 3 (Fall 2001), pp. 427–471. Retrieved 16 July 2019.
The Cold War Track Series 1958–1965. Racing Past. Retrieved 16 July 2019.
Лёгкая атлетика. Справочник / Составитель Р. В. Орлов. — М.: «Физкультура и спорт», 1983. — С. 155—178, 385.
Матчи СССР — США // Лёгкая атлетика. Энциклопедия / Авторы-составители В. Б. Зеличёнок, В. Н. Спичков, В. Л. Штейнбах. — М.: «Человек», 2012. — Т. 1. — С. 623. — .

USA–USSR Track and Field Dual Meet Series
International athletics competitions hosted by the Soviet Union
Sports competitions in Moscow
USA USSR Track and field
USA USSR Track and field
USA USSR Track and field
USA USSR Track and field